The 2022 Super GT Series was a motor racing championship based in Japan for grand touring cars, sanctioned by the Japan Automobile Federation (JAF) and run by the GT Association (GTA). It was the thirtieth season of the JAF Super GT Championship which includes the All Japan Grand Touring Car Championship era, and the eighteenth season under the Super GT name. It was also the fortieth overall season of a national JAF sportscar championship dating back to the All Japan Endurance/Sports Prototype Championship.

Team Impul won the GT500 championship for the first time since 1995, as Kazuki Hiramine and Bertrand Baguette won the Drivers' Championship. It was the first Teams' Championship for Impul since the inaugural 1994 season, and the first championship for the new Nissan Z GT500 which made its debut this season. In GT300, Kondo Racing, Kiyoto Fujinami, and João Paulo de Oliveira won their second set of Drivers' and Teams' Championships in three years.

Calendar

A confirmed eight round provisional 2022 calendar was announced on 6 August 2021. The calendar was updated on 20 October 2021, with the sixth round at Sportsland Sugo moving from the weekend of 10–11 September to 17–18 September, avoiding a clash of dates with the 2022 FIA WEC 6 Hours of Fuji. Distances for all events were confirmed on 5 March 2022: Rounds two and four at Fuji Speedway, and round five at Suzuka Circuit, were 450 kilometre races, while all other rounds were 300 kilometres.

Teams and drivers
All teams competed under a Japanese license.

GT500

GT300

Vehicle Changes

GT500 Class
After 14 seasons, Nissan replaced the Nissan GT-R Nismo GT500 with the new Nissan Z GT500 (RZ34). Nissan last used the Fairlady Z as their flagship GT500 vehicle from 2004 to 2007.
Honda updated their NSX-GT race car, which is now styled after the limited edition Honda NSX Type S model.

GT300 Class
Tsuchiya Engineering (operating as Hoppy Team Tsuchiya) constructed their own version of the Toyota GR Supra to GT300 regulations, replacing their previous Porsche 911 GT3-R.
apr Racing launched the Toyota GR86 GT, constructed to GT300 specifications and based on the second-generation Toyota 86 (ZN8) model. apr's number 30 team and series newcomers SHADE Racing will each field the car in 2022.
Subsequently, muta Racing INGING announced that they will also field the new Toyota GR86 GT, replacing their previous Lotus Evora MC.
The new BMW M4 GT3 (G82) makes its Japanese racing debut via BMW Team Studie x CSL.
Arnage Racing changed vehicles from the Mercedes-AMG GT3, to the Dome-constructed Toyota MC86.
Drago Corse, as part of their new collaboration with Busou (see Entrant Changes below), changed vehicles to the Nissan GT-R Nismo GT3.
ARTA and Team UPGarage entered the upgraded Honda NSX GT3 Evo22.
Team LeMans (Motoyama Racing with Team LeMans in Round 1) entered the upgraded Audi R8 LMS GT3 Evo II.

Entrant Changes

GT500 Class 

 Toyota: Toyota Gazoo Racing announced their GT500 class driver line-ups on 6 December 2021. Reigning GT500 champion Yuhi Sekiguchi transferred to TGR Team SARD, replacing 2016 champion Heikki Kovalainen, who announced on 30 November 2021 that he would not return to the series in 2022. Giuliano Alesi stepped up to GT500 and replaced Sekiguchi at TGR Team au TOM's, alongside reigning GT500 champion Sho Tsuboi. 2017 GT500 champion Ryo Hirakawa left the series after eight years, to join Toyota Gazoo Racing in the 2022 FIA World Endurance Championship. To replace Hirakawa, Ritomo Miyata transferred to TGR Team KeePer TOM's after two seasons at TGR Team WedsSport Bandoh. Sena Sakaguchi, who split time between GT500 and GT300 classes in 2021, replaced Miyata at Team WedsSport Bandoh.
 Honda: Honda Racing Corporation announced their Super GT driver line-ups on 14 January. Nobuharu Matsushita, who made his GT500 debut with Nissan in 2021, rejoined Honda as a factory driver and signed with Astemo Real Racing. Matsushita replaced Bertrand Baguette, who announced his departure from Honda on 1 December 2021.
 Nissan: Nissan and NISMO announced their GT500 class drivers on 25 January 2022. Bertrand Baguette transferred to Nissan and joined Team Impul, taking the place of Nobuharu Matsushita. Mitsunori Takaboshi transferred from Kondo Racing to NDDP Racing, who were now wholly operated by NISMO. In exchange, two-time GT500 champion Kohei Hirate moved to Kondo Racing alongside Daiki Sasaki.

GT300 Class 

 Audi Team Hitotsuyama and Toyota Team Thailand, who competed as arto Team Thailand in 2021, both announced that they would not take part in the 2022 Super GT season.
Super Taikyu Series championship winning team SHADE Racing entered Super GT for the first time, with a Toyota GR86 GT300 riding on Dunlop tyres. Three-time GT300 championship runner-up Katsuyuki Hiranaka (who had spent the previous 13 seasons at Gainer), and F4 Japanese Championship graduate Eijiro Shimizu were announced as the team's driver line-up.
Takuro Shinohara transferred from Audi Team Hitotsuyama to K2 R&D LEON Racing, taking the place of Togo Suganami.
2013 GT300 champion Hideki Mutoh, and Japanese F4 graduate Iori Kimura, formed a new driver line-up for ARTA (Autobacs Racing Team Aguri). Mutoh takes the place of two-time GT300 champion Shinichi Takagi, and Kimura replaced Ren Sato, who competed exclusively in Super Formula.
Another Japanese F4 graduate, Kakunoshin Ohta, joined Team UPGarage, replacing reigning Super Formula Lights champion Teppei Natori. 
GAINER signed Ryuichiro Tomita (who previously raced for the team between 2015 and 2017) and Formula Regional Japanese Championship graduate Riki Okusa to drive their number 10 Nissan GT-R NISMO GT3. Yusuke Shiotsu signed as the number 10 team's third driver, and he replaced Tomita in the seventh round at Autopolis. Keishi Ishikawa moved into their number 11 Nissan. 
Two-time GT300 champion Shinichi Takagi joined K-Tunes Racing, reuniting with three-time GT300 champion Morio Nitta in a driver pairing for the first time since 2010.
BMW Team Studie changed to Michelin tyres for the 2022 season, the first GT300 team to use Michelin tyres since 2020. Studie announced BMW factory driver Augusto Farfus as one of their main drivers for 2022. GT300 race winner and reigning Super Taikyu ST-X class champion Tsubasa Kondo was signed as a third driver for the 450 km races, and replaced Farfus for the third round at Suzuka and at Autopolis.
Yuui Tsutsumi, a first time race winner in 2021, transferred from Max Racing to muta Racing INGING.
Reigning FIA F4 Japanese Champion, Seita Nonaka, joined Hoppy Team Tsuchiya in their new Toyota GR Supra.
Kimiya Sato transferred to Max Racing after three seasons with Hoppy Team Tsuchiya. Max Racing withdrew from the first round following the death of team owner Tsuyoshi Oono, and began their season in the second round at Fuji Speedway
Ryohei Sakaguchi transferred from muta Racing INGING to Arnage Racing. Ryosei Yamashita was announced as the team's third driver, and replaced Kano for the third round at Suzuka and the final round at Motegi.
Drago Corse and vehicle customisation company Busou formed a collaborative entry, Busou Drago Corse. Two-time GT500 and GT300 champion Masataka Yanagida, and GT500 race winner Yuji Ide were named as the drivers. Drago Corse founder Ryo Michigami stepped away from driving duties to become the new team director, and Dunlop became the new tyre supplier, replacing Yokohama. 
Two-time Super Taikyu ST-3 champion and sim racer Yusuke Tomibayashi joined Team Mach for his Super GT debut, partnering the returning Reiji Hiraki.

Mid-season changes

GT300 Class 

 On 19 April, Team LeMans terminated their contract with driver Satoshi Motoyama after the opening round of the season. The name of the team reverted from "Motoyama Racing with Team LeMans" back to Team LeMans. Formula 1 and FIA World Endurance Championship alumnus Roberto Merhi and GT300 race winner Shintaro Kawabata joined the team for the Fuji GT 450 km Race. Merhi would contest the remainder of the season alongside Yoshiaki Katayama.
 On 1 August, Drago Corse and Busou terminated their partnership, and the team did not return for the remainder of the season.
 Due to Takeshi Kimura's commitments in the European Le Mans Series, 2012 GT300 Champion Naoki Yokomizo joined Pacific CarGuy Racing for the opening round at Okayama. Yokomizo was the team's third driver in the Fuji 450 km in May. For the Fuji 100 Lap race in August, Shintaro Kawabata became the team's third driver. Yokomizo again replaced Kimura for the Suzuka 450 km.
 2020 FIA F4 Japanese Champion Hibiki Taira joined apr for the two races at Fuji Speedway, as a third driver in the number 30 Toyota GR86 GT. Taira also joined the team for the Suzuka 450 km, while Hiroaki Nagai was replaced by Yuta Kamimura just before the Suzuka 450 km due to illness.
 Super Formula Lights driver Kazuto Kotaka joined apr for the Fuji 100 Lap race and Suzuka 450 km, as a third driver in the number 31 Toyota GR Sport Prius PHV GT.
 2019 TCR Japan Sunday Series Champion Takeshi Suehiro joined Arnage Racing as a third driver for the three long-distance races at Fuji and Suzuka.
 Togo Suganami replaced Hiroki Yoshida for the Fuji GT 450 km Race, after Yoshida tested positive for COVID-19.
 Yusaku Shibata rejoined Tomei Sports as a third driver for the three long-distance races at Fuji and Suzuka. Shibata also took part in the Suzuka 300 km and in the sixth round at Sugo, replacing Atsushi Tanaka.
 Yuya Hiraki joined NILZZ Racing for the Suzuka 300 km, replacing Yuki Tanaka. For the following Fuji GT 100 Lap Race, Tanaka rejoined the team. Masaya Kohno made his series debut in the Fuji 100 Lap race and also competed in the Suzuka 450 km as a third driver. 
 Teppei Natori joined Tomei Sports for the final round at Motegi.

Results
Drivers credited with winning Pole Position for their respective teams are indicated in bold text.

Championship Standings

Drivers' championships

Scoring system

GT500

GT300

Notes

References

External links 
 Super GT Official Website

Super GT seasons
Super GT Series
Super GT